Alaska Pacific University (APU) is a private university in Anchorage, Alaska. It was established as Alaska Methodist University in 1957. Although it was renamed to Alaska Pacific University in 1978, it is still affiliated with the United Methodist Church. The main campus is located adjacent to the University of Alaska Anchorage (UAA) and the Alaska Native Medical Center.

History

The university was founded in the late 1950s as Alaska Methodist University by Peter Gordon Gould, an Aleut from Unga, Alaska. Gould became the first Alaska Native minister in the United Methodist Church later in life, and used his position to campaign for the development of a Methodist University in Alaska.

Alaska Methodist University dedicated its campus on June 28, 1959. In April 1958, Dr. Donald F. Ebright was elected as the university's first administrative president. Frederick P. McGinnis was elected in 1960, and served as acting president to the first class of students to attend the university. Approximately 900 acres of land destined to become the site of the APU Kellogg Campus was attained in 1973 from the DeWolf-Kellogg Trust.

In November 1978 Alaska Methodist University was renamed Alaska Pacific University. Despite the university's origins with Judeo-Christian traditions found in United Methodism, there is no sectarian or doctrinal creed found in its educational offerings. In 2016, APU formed a strategic partnership with the Alaska Native Tribal Health Consortium, the largest Tribal health organization in the country. The partnership supports the development of academic and cultural programs focusing on the needs of the state and Alaska Natives.

Academics
The Early Honors program functions as an alternative to the senior year in high school. 
Undergraduates can pursue liberal arts and sciences programs. APU's course year is split into "block" sessions of four weeks, co-existing alongside the "session" of eleven weeks to form a semester. APU offers nine graduate programs, eight master's degrees and one doctoral degree. There are also several graduate certificate options. APU also offers a professional studies programs for non-traditional students.

Campus

The main campus includes academic facilities, residence halls, community gathering spaces, recreational facilities, and winter and summer recreational trails. The campus consists of eight major buildings, with five of them currently utilized directly by the university. The three other buildings on the main campus are offices for the US Geological Survey, Alaska Public Media, and the Alaska Spine Institute.

The Atwood Center is listed on the National Register of Historic Places as the location (along with North and South Atwood) of a major conference of Alaska Natives at the time of the passage of the Alaska Native Claims Settlement Act in 1971. APU has an extension of its campus in Palmer, AK known as the Kellogg Campus. It functions as a 700-acre working farm for students of the sustainability program, as well as an environmental learning center for home-schooled students.

There are multiple housing accommodations on the main campus, divided up by class year designations. All incoming freshman under 21 years of age are required to live on campus for their first two years.

Student life

Athletics
Alaska Pacific University is known for its Nordic Ski Team. The APU Nordic Ski Center (APUNSC) was established in 1999 as a regional Olympic training center for cross-country skiers. According to the center's "About" page, the mission of APUNSC is to encourage involvement in cross-country skiing programs in Anchorage. APUNSC offers year-round training programs for all levels of skiers who wish to compete professionally.

Alaska Methodist University's ski team sent four skiers to the 1972 Winter Olympics; AMU/APU has sent at minimum one skier to every winter Olympics after 1972, including Kikkan Randall who became a gold medalist in the cross-country skiing event at the 2018 Winter Olympics.

Clubs/Associations
Associated Students of Alaska Pacific University (ASAPU) is the elected body for student government. ASAPU members represent student interests and oversee student clubs and organizations. APU has a typical assortment of student clubs and organizations with which students can affiliate themselves.

In the Residence Halls, the Resident Activity Programming Board hosts events for students who live on campus.

Notable alumni
Sadie Bjornsen, cross-country skier (Olympian in 2014 and 2018)
Holly Brooks, former cross-country skier (Olympian in 2010 and 2014)
Sharon Cissna, member of the Alaska House of Representatives
Lew Freedman, author, sports writer and columnist at Anchorage Daily News
Katherine Gottlieb, President & CEO of Southcentral Foundation
Albert Kookesh, former member of the Alaska Senate and Tlingit community leader
Walt Monegan, former police chief of Anchorage and former Alaska Commissioner of Public Safety
Kikkan Randall, cross-country skier (Olympian in 2006 and 2018; gold medal winner in 2018)
Josh Revak, Purple Heart recipient and member of the Alaska State Senate
Scott Stephens, vocalist for Liquid Blue
Rosita Worl, president of the Sealaska Heritage Institute

References

External links
 
 History of AMU
 

1957 establishments in Alaska
 
Buildings and structures in Anchorage, Alaska
Educational institutions established in 1957
Methodism in Alaska
Private universities and colleges in Alaska
Universities and colleges accredited by the Northwest Commission on Colleges and Universities
Universities and colleges affiliated with the United Methodist Church